Volt Netherlands (usually simply called Volt) is a social-liberal political party in the Netherlands. It is the Dutch branch of Volt Europa, a political movement that operates on a European level.

History

Volt Nederland was founded in Utrecht on 23 June 2018, with Reinier van Lanschot as its first chairman. The party owes its start and foundation partly to donations through crowdfunding.

The 2019 European Parliament election was the first election in which Volt took part. The party obtained 106,004 votes in the Netherlands, more than 100,000 votes too few for a seat. The party received most of its votes in university cities, such as Amsterdam, Leiden, Utrecht and Wageningen. Although the Dutch branch of Volt was unable to obtain a seat in the European Parliament, it is currently represented by the German branch, which won one seat.

In 2021, the party participated in the Dutch general election. On 25 October 2020, the party adopted its candidate list, with Laurens Dassen as the top candidate. At the beginning of 2021, the Electoral Council announced that Volt would participate in all 20 electoral districts. National opinion polling typically excluded the party until six weeks before the election, when their popularity began to rise; a number of polls in the days leading up to election day showed them projected to win up to three seats. Volt ultimately won 2.4% of votes, their best national performance in any election to date, and three seats, marking their first entrance into a national legislature. The three seats of Volt were taken up by Laurens Dassen, Nilüfer Gündoğan, and Marieke Koekkoek. The latter was elected because of individual preference votes.

In February 2022, Gündoğan was expelled from the parliamentary group and suspended from the party after thirteen party members had accused her of undesirable behavior. She filed charges of libel and defamation against Volt, Dassen and the accusers, and challenged the expulsion in civil court. The court reinstated her, ruling that Volt had not followed proper procedure. Dassen apologized. Later Volt appealed the verdict, Dassen and Koekkoek changed its parliamentary rules and Gündoğan was expelled from both the party and the parliamentary group. She did not give up her seat, so she currently sits as an independent.

For the local elections of 2022, 25 local chapters of the party had registered. However, according to party statements, it had failed to achieve gender-equal lists of candidates in some municipalities and was therefore contesting in fewer places than planned.

Electoral results

2019 European Parliament election

2021 Dutch general election

2022 local elections

2023 provincial elections

Notes

References

Liberal parties in the Netherlands
Pro-European political parties in the Netherlands
Social liberal parties
Political parties established in 2018
2018 establishments in the Netherlands
Netherlands